Live in Japan is an live album by singer and songwriter Leon Russell. The album was recorded two live tour sessions. The first record section is a 1973 tour show at Budokan in Japan on  November 8, 1973. The second recorded section is from a 1971 tour show in Sam Houston Coliseum. While the album had some of Leon's new hits, like "Tight Rope" and "A Song for You," the album did not chart in the top 200. His early live album Leon Live peaked at #9 on the U.S. charts. The album was first released as a vinyl LP by Shelter Records. Live in Japan was re-released on CD by Omnivore Recordings in 2011 and again in 2013 with bonus tracks. The album was by produced by Leon Russell, Nobuya Itoh, Peter Nicholls and Denny Cordell. 
 The new CD releases were after Leon recordings earned six gold records. He received two Grammy awards from seven nominations. In 2011, he was inducted into both the Rock and Roll Hall of Fame and the Songwriters Hall of Fame. One of his biggest early fans, Elton John, said Russell was a "mentor" and an "inspiration". They recorded their album The Union in 2010, which earned them a Grammy nomination.

Track listing
All songs performed by Leon Russell. All tracks composed by Leon Russell except as noted below.

Tracks 1-9 Recorded live in Japan. 
Tracks 10-16 Recorded live in Houston, 1971
	
 Heaven (Patrick Henderson) -	4:56 	
Over the Rainbow / God Put a Rainbow (Harold Arlen / E.Y. "Yip" Harburg) - 	5:39 	
 Queen of the Roller Derby - 	1:49 	
 Roll Away the Stone  (Greg Dempsey) -	4:03 	
Tight Rope  -	2:58 	
Sweet Emily  -	3:23 	
 Alcatraz -  4:04 	
 You Don't Have to Go (Jimmy Reed) - 	2:34 	
 A Song for You, Of Thee I Sing, Roll in My Sweet Baby's Arms (Lester Flatt )  - 	7:10 	
 Alcatraz - 4:49 	
 Stranger in a Strange Land  (Don Preston) - 4:51 	
 Groupie (Superstar) (With Bonnie Bramlett) -	3:54 	
 Roll Over Beethoven (Chuck Berry) - 	3:52 	
 Blues Power / Shoot Out on the Plantation / As the Years Go Passing By / The Woman I Love (Eric Clapton / Joe Josea / B.B. King / Deadric Malone) - 	11:08 	
 Jumpin' Jack Flash (Mick Jagger / Keith Richards) -	4:54 	
 Of Thee I Sing, Yes I Am  - 	9:35

Personnel
Leon Russell 	Composer, Piano, Primary Artist, Quotation Author, Vocals
Delrose Allen 	Vocals (Background)
Greg Allen 	Art Direction, Design
Audrey Bilger 	Project Assistant
Chuck Blackwell 	Drums
Ambrose Campbell 	Congas
Carolyn Cook 	Vocals (Background)
Joey Cooper 	Guitar, Vocals (Background)
Carl Radle 	Bass
Nettie Davenport 	Vocals (Background)
Charlene Foster 	Vocals (Background)
Wayne Perkins 	Guitar, Vocals (Background)
John Gallie 	Organ
Rev. Patrick Henderson 	Piano, Vocals
Nobuya Itoh 	Producer
Peter Nicholls 	Producer
Denny Cordell 	Producer
Takashi Kitazawa 	Director
Lee Lodyga 	Project Assistant
Gavin Lurssen 	Mastering
Nikki Nieves 	Project Assistant
Masao Ohgiya 	Design
Patrick Henderson 	Composer, Liner Notes
Cory Hillis 	Project Assistant
Cheryl Pawelski 	Reissue Producer
Jan Persson 	Photography
Don Preston 	Composer
Bradford Rosenberger 	Project Assistant
Steve Todoroff 	Liner Notes
Steven Casper 	Project Assistant
Rueben Cohen 	Mastering
Harvey Drivian 	Project Assistant
Lyn Fey 	Editorial
Jun Miyajima 	Photography
Suenori Fukui 	Engineer, Remixing

References

External links

Leon Russell discography
Leon Russell lyrics
Leon Russell Records
Leon Russell NAMM Oral History Program Interview (2012)

1975 live albums
Leon Russell albums
Shelter Records albums
Albums produced by Leon Russell